Marshal of the Royal Australian Air Force (MRAAF) is the highest rank of the Royal Australian Air Force and was created as a direct equivalent of the British Royal Air Force rank of Marshal of the Royal Air Force.  It is considered a five-star rank.

It has only twice been awarded, each time as an honorary rank to a senior member of the Royal Family.  On 2 June 1939 King George VI assumed the rank which he held until his death in 1952.  Two years later in 1954, Prince Philip, the Duke of Edinburgh was granted the rank. He was present at the 50th anniversary celebrations of the Royal Australian Air Force in March 1971 as a marshal of the RAAF; and continued to hold the rank until his death in 2021.

Marshal of the Royal Australian Air Force is a higher rank than air chief marshal. Marshal of the Royal Australian Air Force is a direct equivalent of admiral of the fleet in the Royal Australian Navy and field marshal in the Australian Army.

The insignia is four light blue bands (each on a slightly wider black band) over a light blue band on a black broad band.

Marshals of the Royal Australian Air Force

See also

Ranks of the RAAF
Australian Defence Force ranks and insignia
Air force officer rank insignia

References

Royal Australian Air Force
Military ranks of Australia
Australia